Neotina is a genus of beetles belonging to the family Coccinellidae.

Species:

Neotina cariba

References

Coccinellidae
Coccinellidae genera